KKZY (95.5 FM) is a radio station based in Bemidji, Minnesota, United States and airs an adult contemporary music format. It is owned by Hubbard Broadcasting, Inc.

The Bemidji studios are located at 502 Beltrami Avenue, downtown Bemidji. It shares a transmitter site with KBHP, near Lake Plantagenet along Highway 9.

KKZY began broadcasting on May 7, 1999, under the ownership of Omni Broadcasting.

Hubbard Broadcasting announced on November 13, 2014, that it would purchase the Omni Broadcasting stations, including KKZY. The sale was completed on February 27, 2015, at a purchase price of $8 million for the 16 stations and one translator.

References

External links
KZY Website

Radio stations in Minnesota
Mainstream adult contemporary radio stations in the United States
Radio stations established in 1988
Hubbard Broadcasting